Manitou Dawn is a fictional superhero character in the DC Comics universe.

Fictional character biography
Dawn and her late husband Manitou Raven hail from the Obsidian Age of Atlantis, circa 1000 BC. They were born in North America, from a tribe which would one day become the Apache Tribe. Few details are known about Dawn's early life. Raven once intimated, however, that when she was thirteen, she was called "the goat", because unlike other girls, she fought back when pushed. As she matured, she drew the attention of her tribe's chief, Big Father. He bought her from her family, but things ended badly. Ultimately she found a dynamic and kindred spirit in Raven. The two actually fell in love on the night Dawn burned his house to the ground.

Raven was recruited by the rulers of Atlantis — Rama Khan and Gamemnae — to join heroes from across the globe (and from rival societies) and form a multicultural "League of Ancients". During this time Dawn played no active role, but after the Justice League defeated Gamemnae, Raven changed his alliance and they chose to accompany the JLA into the future. Raven became a member of the Justice League and, after some initial culture shock, Dawn took quickly into 20th century culture. In her first interaction with the JLA, she offered herself sexually to Superman. She soon set about learning English with the help of her new friend, Firestorm. Meanwhile, the Manitou continued to immerse himself in his work and grew more distant from her.

Justice League Elite
Raven was soon recruited into the Justice League Elite by Vera Black, who approached the JLA with a bold proposition: to  form the Justice League Elite, a black ops team organized to fight extranormal threats before they reach the public. They moved to a secret base in New Jersey called The Factory and naturally, Dawn accompanied her husband.

During this time, Dawn became more distanced from her husband. His constant attention to work and the trials of the "Stony Path" kept him from satisfying her needs and she became friendly with Green Arrow. Soon the two engaged in a sexual relationship — not unbeknownst to Raven. Raven was angered of course, but was too consumed by his work to confront her. Before the couple could truly reconcile, Raven died while taking the brunt of a bomb blast, but that would not be the last heard from such a powerful magician.

The team's coordinator, Naif al-Sheikh closed the Factory and offered housing for Dawn, which she refused. She gave al-Sheikh Raven's hatchet but kept his magical staff for herself. Then in grief and anger, she inadvertently summoned Raven's spirit via the staff and uttered his magic phrase, "Inukchuk!" Dawn then assumed Raven's mantle of power and she was permanently marked on the face by his spectral touch.

Now Manitou Dawn she helped the Elite finish their last case and helped uncover the team's traitor, Menagerie. Dawn has since taken a semi-active role in the Justice League. She was present for Aquaman's ceremony that disbanded the JLA. There she also met Black Canary, who sensed Dawn's former affair with Green Arrow. During the Infinite Crisis, Dawn was a key player in stopping The Key, who had developed new, super-powerful telepathy.

So far, Raven has remained close to Dawn, in a spiritual form, acting as an unpredictable advisor.

During the aftermath of the Reign of Doomsday event, Batman mentions that Manitou Dawn and Zatanna are working together to track down Supergirl after her kidnapping at the hands of Doomsday.

The Witching Hour 
Manitou Dawn was one of the witches (along with Witchfire, Black Orchid, Circe, and Wonder Woman) that Hecate marked as a young girl to hide a piece of her soul from powerful magic users. When she activated the witchmark, Manitou Dawn was overtaken by Hecate and forced to destroy Nanda Parbat and the goddess Rama Kushna. Zatanna and Constantine were able to exorcise Hecate from all the witchmarked before this could happen.

References

Characters created by Joe Kelly
Comics characters introduced in 2003
DC Comics characters who use magic
DC Comics female superheroes
Fictional Apache people
Fictional Native American women